The Argentina women's national football team has represented Argentina at the FIFA Women's World Cup at three stagings of the tournament, in 2003, 2007, and 2019.

FIFA Women's World Cup record

World Cup record

Record by opponent

2003 FIFA Women's World Cup

Group C

2007 FIFA Women's World Cup

Group A

2019 FIFA Women's World Cup

Group D

2023 FIFA Women's World Cup

Group G

Goalscorers

References

 
Countries at the FIFA Women's World Cup